"Jack Sprat" (or "Jack Spratt") is an English language nursery rhyme. It has a Roud Folk Song Index number of 19479.

Rhyme
The most common modern version of the rhyme is:

Origins
The name "Jack Sprat" was used of people of small stature in the 16th century. This rhyme was an English proverb from at least the mid-17th century. It appeared in John Clarke's collection of sayings in 1639 in the form:

As with many nursery rhymes, "Jack Sprat" may have originated as a satire on a public figure: history writer Linda Alchin suggests that Jack was King Charles I, who was left "lean" when parliament denied him taxation, but with his queen Henrietta Maria he was free to "lick the platter clean" after he dissolved parliament—Charles was a notably short man. An alternative explanation  comes from the popular Robin Hood legend, applying it to the disliked King John and his greedy queen Isabella.

The saying entered the canon of English nursery rhymes when it was printed in Mother Goose's Melody around 1765, but it may have been adopted for use with children much earlier.

Notes

Jack tales
English folk songs
English children's songs
Traditional children's songs
Songs about fictional male characters
English nursery rhymes